Frederick Louis le Roux (5 February 1882 – 22 September 1963) was a South African cricketer.

Le Roux was born in Somerset East, Cape Colony. He was in a pool of players for consideration for the 1912 Triangular Tournament in England, but was not selected by the committee to travel. He played in his only Test match in February 1914, during England's tour to South Africa. He scored just one run in his two innings and bowled nine overs without taking a wicket. He also captained Transvaal in domestic cricket for several seasons.  He died, aged 81, in Durban, Natal.

References

1882 births
1963 deaths
South Africa Test cricketers
South African cricketers
Eastern Province cricketers
Gauteng cricketers
People from Somerset East
Cricketers from the Eastern Cape